Meshir 6 - Coptic Calendar - Meshir 8

The seventh day of the Coptic month of Meshir, the sixth month of the Coptic year. On a common year, this day corresponds to February 1, of the Julian Calendar, and February 14, of the Gregorian Calendar. This day falls in the Coptic Season of Shemu, the season of the Harvest.

Commemorations

Saints 

 The departure of Pope Alexadnros II, the 43rd Patriarch of the See of Saint Mark 
 The departure of Pope Theodore, the 45th Patriarch of the See of Saint Mark

References 

Days of the Coptic calendar